Alexander Gibbon (born 7 October 1992) is an Australian rugby union wing who currently plays for  in Australia's National Rugby Championship. He has also previously represented Super Rugby side, the Queensland Reds.

Early life and career
Gibbon was born in New South Wales, but attended school in Brisbane at St Joseph's College, Nudgee. From there he went back to his native state and from 2012 turned out for Southern Districts in the Shute Shield. He played a one-off match for Combined New South Wales–Queensland Country against the British & Irish Lions in 2013 and was named in the Greater Sydney Rams squad for the National Rugby Championship in 2014 although he didn't make any appearances.

Rugby career

International sevens
Gibbon represented Australia in rugby sevens between 2013 and 2017, appearing in 21 competitions and scoring 25 tries.

Super Rugby statistics

References

1992 births
Living people
Australian rugby union players
Rugby union wings
Brisbane City (rugby union) players
Queensland Reds players
Australia international rugby sevens players
Male rugby sevens players